Dahlström, Dahlstrom, Dalström, Dalstrom or Dahlstrøm may refer to:

Dahlström (surname), Swedish and Norwegian (Dahlstrøm) surname
13269 Dahlstrom, a minor planet